Guido Holzknecht (3 December 1872 – 30 October 1931) was an Austrian radiologist who was a native of Vienna.

He studied in Strasbourg, Königsberg, and Vienna, and became the director of the X-ray laboratory at Vienna General Hospital in 1905 . He later established a central radiology department at the hospital, which became known as the Guido Holzknecht Institute. With radiologist Robert Kienböck (1871–1953), he was a co-founder of the Wiener Röntgengesellschaft (Vienna Radiology Society).

The statue of Holzknecht in Arne Carlsson Park was originally made by Josef Josephu. Damaged during the Second World War, it was later restored incorrectly. The family had commissioned Josephu to show missing fingers that Holzknecht had lost due to radiation poisoning. The restored statue shows all of his fingers intact. Additionally, the signature on the restore statue read JosefHeu, who was not a sculptor - misspelling the original artists name.

Guido Holzknecht was a pioneer in radiology. In 1902 he devised a color dosimeter (referred to as a "chromoradiometer") for detecting and measuring X-rays. Like a number of other physicians in the early days of radiology, he died from the consequences of radiation poisoning in October 1931 aged 58. He was cremated at Feuerhalle Simmering, where also his ashes are buried.

Holzknecht joined the Vienna Psychoanalytic Society in 1910. He later also treated Sigmund Freud, making an unsuccessful adjuvant irradiation attempt for Freud's oral cavity squamous cell carcinoma (to which Freud eventually succumbed).

His name is included on the Monument to the X-ray and Radium Martyrs of All Nations erected in Hamburg, Germany in 1936.

Associated eponym 
 Holzknecht's space, also known as retro-cardiac space. It is located between the posterior wall of the heart and the vertebral column.

Selected writings 

 Röntgenologische Diagnostik der Erkrankung der Brusteingeweide (Radiological diagnostics of breast cancer), 1901
 Röntgendiagnostik des Magenkrebses (1905).  
 Röntgenologie, 2 vols., (Radiology) 1918/1924
 Röntgentherapie, (X-ray therapy) 1924
 Einstellung zur Röntgenologie, (Attitudes to radiology) 1927
 Handbuch der theoretischen und klinischen Röntgenkunde, 2 vols., (Handbook of theoretical and clinical X-ray studies), (1929).

References 
 This article is based on a translation of an article from German Wikipedia.
 European Radiology, (biography)

Austrian radiologists
1872 births
1931 deaths
Physicians from Vienna
Analysands of Sigmund Freud
Victims of radiological poisoning
Austrian amputees
X-ray pioneers
Burials at Feuerhalle Simmering